Elections were held in Illinois on Tuesday, November 3, 1970.

Primaries were held on March 17, 1970.

Additionally, on December 15, 1970, a special election was held in which Illinois voters voted in support of adopting a new proposed state constitution.

Election information
1970 was a midterm election year in the United States.

Turnout
Turnout in the primary election was 29.88%, with a total of 1,570,317 ballots cast. 819,692 Democratic and 750,625 Republican primary ballots were cast.

Turnout during the general election was 69.90%, with 3,731,006 ballots cast.

2,017,717 people cast ballots in the December 15 special election regarding the proposed new Illinois constitution.

Federal elections

United States Senate

A special election was held to fill the remainder of the term of Republican Everett Dirksen, who had died in office. Republican Ralph Tyler Smith had been appointed to fill the seat after Dirksen's death, and he lost the special election to Democrat Adlai Stevenson III.

United States House 

All 24 Illinois seats in the United States House of Representatives were up for election in 1970.

No seats switched parties, so the party composition of Illinois' House delegation remained 12 Democrats and 12 Republicans.

State elections

Treasurer 

Incumbent Treasurer Adlai Stevenson III, a Democrat, did not seek a second term, instead opting to run for United States Senate. Democrat Alan J. Dixon was elected to succeed him in office.

Since Adlai Stevenson III assumed his U.S. Senate office November 17, due to the nature of it being a special election, there was a brief vacancy in the treasurer's office before Dixon would assume office. Therefore, Governor Richard B. Ogilvie appointed Republican Charles W. Woodford to serve as treasurer from November 17 until Dixon took office on January 3.

Democratic primary

Republican primary

General election

Superintendent of Public Instruction 

Incumbent  Superintendent of Public Instruction Ray Page, a Republican seeking a third term, was defeated by Democrat Michael Bakalis.

Democratic primary

Republican primary

General election

State Senate
Seats in the Illinois Senate were up for election in 1970. While there was a 29-29 member split in the chamber after the election, Democrats flipped control of the chamber since there was a Democratic lieutenant governor (Paul Simon).

State House of Representatives
Seats in the Illinois House of Representatives were up for election in 1970. Republicans retained control of the chamber.

Trustees of University of Illinois
 
Elections were held to elect Trustees of University of Illinois system. This included a regularly-scheduled  election of three seats, and a special election to fill a vacancy.

Regular election
The regular to fill three seats saw the election new Democratic members William D. Forsyth Jr., George W. Howard III, and Earl L. Neal.

Incumbent Republican Earl Edwin Walker (appointed in 1970) was not reelected. Incumbent Republican W. Clement Stone (appointed in 1969 to replace Harold Pogue following his death in office) lost reelection, running in the regular election instead of the special election to fill Pogue's seat. Second-term Democratic incumbent Howard W. Clement was not renominated. Also not renominated was Democrat Theodore A. Jones (who had been appointed in 1963, and thereafter reelected in 1964)

Special election
Democrat Roger B. Pogue defeated Republican educator and Illinois State Representative Frances L. Dawson in the special election to fill the remaining two years of an unexpired term. Despite losing in the popular vote, Dawson placed first in 64 counties, while Pogue placed first in 38.

Incumbent Republican W. Clement Stone (appointed in 1969 to replace Harold Pogue, whose seat this had been, after his death in office), did not run in this election, instead running in the regular election for a full term.

Turnout for the special election was 60.87%.

Judicial elections
Multiple judicial positions were up for election in 1970.

Ballot measures (November 3)
Three ballot measures (two legislatively referred constitutional amendments and one bond measure) were on the ballot on November 3. The two legislatively referred constitutional amendments proposed amendments to the existing 1870 Constitution of Illinois. In order to be placed on the ballot, legislatively referred constitutional amendments needed to be approved by two-thirds of each house of the Illinois General Assembly. In order to be approved, they required votes equal to a majority of those who voted in the 1970 elections, or two thirds of those voting specifically on the measure.

Illinois Ad Valorem Tax Prohibition Amendment
The Ad Valorem Tax Prohibition Amendment, also known as "Amendment 1", prohibited the taxation of personal property by valuation.

Illinois Anti-Pollution Amendment 
The Illinois Anti-Pollution Amendment, also known as "Amendment 2", approved the Anti-pollution Bond Act.

Bond measures needed a vote equal to majority of the votes cast for whichever chamber of the Illinois General Assembly had the highest cumulative vote count.

Illinois Banking Act Amendment 
The Illinois Banking Act Amendment, also known as "Amendment 3", enabled state chartered banks to have the same powers as national banks.

Ballot measures (December 15)
A December 15 special election was held in which the proposed 1970 Constitution of Illinois itself was up for election, as were several constitutional convention referral items. The constitutional convention referral items would only take effect if the new constitution itself was approved.

The constitution and all amendments to amend it were required to be approved by at least half of all those casting ballots in the election.

2,017,717 people cast ballots.

Constitution Ratification Question 
Illinois voters voted on whether or not the state would adopt the Illinois Constitution of 1970.

Appoint All Judges Amendment  
The Appoint All Judges Amendment was a ballot question which asked voters whether judges should be appointed by the governor from a list of nominees or elected by the people.

Death Penalty Amendment
The Death Penalty Amendment proposed abolishing the death penalty in Illinois. It was defeated.

State Representation Amendment
The Illinois State Representation Amendment (also known as the "Elect Legislature Question") was a ballot question which asked voters whether they wished to retain multi-member districts in the state legislature of switch to single-member districts.

Voting Age Amendment 
The Voting Age Amendment proposed lowering the age of suffrage to 18. It was defeated.

Local elections
Local elections were held.

References

 
Illinois